Raina Yakimova Kabaivanska ; born 15 December 1934) is a Bulgarian opera singer, one of the leading lirico-spinto sopranos of her generation, particularly associated with Verdi and Puccini, although she sang a wide range of roles.

Biography
Born in Burgas, Bulgaria, she studied in Sofia with Prokopova and Yosifov, and made her debut at the Bulgarian National Opera in Sofia as Tatjana in Tchaikovsky's Eugene Onegin in 1957. The following year, she left for Italy for further studies with Zina Fumagalli-Riva in Milan and with Giulia Tess in Vercelli. Two years later she made a breakthrough in Fano, Italy, as Nedda in Leoncavallo's Pagliacci. In 1961, she gave her first performance at La Scala in Milan, as Agnese in Bellini's Beatrice di Tenda, opposite Dame Joan Sutherland. She sang widely in Italy, Genoa, Venice, Parma and notably in Turin in 1973, as Elena in I vespri siciliani, in the only production ever directed by Maria Callas.

In 1962, she made her debuts at both the Royal Opera House in London, as Desdemona in Verdi's Otello, and the Metropolitan Opera in New York, as Nedda. She went on performing at the Bolshoi Theatre in Moscow, the Teatro Colón in Buenos Aires, the Paris Opéra, the Vienna State Opera, the Budapest Opera, the Lyric Opera of Chicago, the San Francisco Opera, the Dallas Opera, the Teatro dell'Opera di Roma, etc.

She also appeared in a few opera films, notably Pagliacci,  opposite Jon Vickers in 1968, Il trovatore, opposite Franco Bonisolli, in 1975, and Tosca, opposite Plácido Domingo, in 1976.

A versatile singer with a beautiful voice and fine musicianship, she is also a singing-actress of considerable ability.

Kabaivanska has received the following international opera awards: Bellini (1965), Viotti d'Oro (1970), Puccini (1978), Illica (1979), Monteverdi (1980), the Award of Accademia 'Medici' – Lorenzo il Magnifico, Florence (1990), the Grand Prix  'A Life, Dedicated to the Music', Venice (2000). 

Kabaivanska delivered an emotional performance of the "Ave Maria" from the opera Otello by Giuseppe Verdi to open the funeral mass for Luciano Pavarotti in Modena, Italy on 8 September 2007.

Kabaivanska has added another role to her considerable repertoire: the Comtesse in Tchaikowsky's Queen of Spades, in a series of five performances (31 January – 19 February 2008) at the Capitole de Toulouse.

She is a professor in Italy at the Accademia Musicale Chigiana in Siena, at the Vecchi-Tonelli Music Institute in Modena, and at New Bulgarian University in Sofia. She is also a jury member for many prestigious competitions all over the world.

Repertory

Honors
 Grand Officer of the Order of Merit of the Italian Republic – December 7, 2000

References

Sources
 Operissimo.com

External links 

 
 

1934 births
Living people
Musicians from Burgas
Bulgarian operatic sopranos
Bulgarian emigrants to Italy
20th-century Bulgarian women opera singers
21st-century Bulgarian women opera singers